Au Train Bay is a small bay, approximately 4 mi (6 km) across, on the southern shore of Lake Superior along the coast of Alger County in the Upper Peninsula of Michigan.

The town of Au Train sits along the middle of the south shore of the bay.

References 

Bodies of water of Alger County, Michigan
Bays of Michigan
Bays of Lake Superior